Asphondylia helianthiglobulus is a species of gall midge in the family Cecidomyiidae. The larvae of this species induce galls on the stems of several sunflower species in eastern North America, including Helianthus giganteus, H. grosseserratus, and H. maximiliani.

References

Cecidomyiinae
Articles created by Qbugbot
Insects described in 1878
Taxa named by Carl Robert Osten-Sacken
Diptera of North America
Gall-inducing insects